Mixothrips is a genus of thrips in the family Phlaeothripidae.

Species
 Mixothrips craigheadi
 Mixothrips nakaharai

References

Phlaeothripidae
Thrips
Thrips genera